Group 1 of the UEFA Women's Euro 2017 qualifying competition consisted of five teams: Iceland, Scotland, Belarus, Slovenia, and Macedonia. The composition of the eight groups in the qualifying group stage was decided by the draw held on 20 April 2015.

The group was played in home-and-away round-robin format. The group winners qualified directly for the final tournament, while the runners-up also qualified directly if they were one of the six best runners-up among all eight groups (not counting results against the fifth-placed team); otherwise, the runners-up advance to the play-offs.

Standings

Matches
Times are CEST (UTC+2) for dates between 29 March and 24 October 2015 and between 27 March and 29 October 2016, for other dates times are CET (UTC+1).

Goalscorers
10 goals

 Harpa Þorsteinsdóttir
 Jane Ross

7 goals

 Dagný Brynjarsdóttir

6 goals

 Joanne Love

5 goals

 Margrét Lára Viðarsdóttir
 Kim Little
 Tjaša Tibaut

4 goals

 Yulia Slesarchik
 Lara Prašnikar

3 goals

 Fanndís Friðriksdóttir
 Rachel Corsie
 Barbara Kralj

2 goals

 Ekaterina Avkhimovich
 Hallbera Guðný Gísladóttir
 Gunnhildur Jónsdóttir
 Eli Jakovska
 Lisa Evans
 Caroline Weir
 Kaja Eržen
 Mateja Zver

1 goal

 Anastasia Linnik
 Anastasia Shcherbachenia
 Anastasia Shuppo
 Elvira Urazaeva
 Sara Björk Gunnarsdóttir
 Elín Metta Jensen
 Sandra Jessen
 Hólmfríður Magnúsdóttir
 Glódís Perla Viggósdóttir
 Simona Krstanovska
 Gentjana Rochi
 Jen Beattie
 Hayley Lauder
 Kristina Erman
 Lara Ivanuša
 Evelina Kos
 Manja Rogan

1 own goal

 Anastasia Linnik (playing against Slovenia)

References

External links
Standings, UEFA.com

Group 1